Todd Woodbridge and Mark Woodforde were the defending champions, but decided to compete at Indian Wells in the same week.

Nicklas Kulti and Magnus Larsson won the title by defeating Hendrik Jan Davids and Libor Pimek 6–3, 6–4 in the final.

Seeds

Draw

Draw

References

External links
 Official results archive (ATP)
 Official results archive (ITF)

1992 Copenhagen Open – 2
1992 ATP Tour